The 4th Military District was an administrative district of the Australian Army. During the Second World War, the 4th Military District covered all of South Australia, with its headquarters at Adelaide. Around the start of the Second World War, the 4th Military District became part of Southern Command, along with the 3rd and 6th Military Districts in Victoria and Tasmania. This required legislative changes to the Defence Act (1903), and did not come into effect until October 1939.

Units during Second World War

Headquarters
4th Military District Headquarters – Adelaide

6th Cavalry Brigade
Headquarters – Keswick
3rd Light Horse Regiment (The South Australian Mounted Rifles) – Mt. Gambier
9th/23rd Light Horse Regiment (Flinders Light Horse/Barossa Light Horse) – Clare
18th Light Horse (Machine Gun) Regiment (The Adelaide Lancers) – Unley

3rd Infantry Brigade
Headquarters – Keswick
10th Battalion (The Adelaide Rifles) – Adelaide
27th Battalion (The South Australian Scottish Regiment) – Keswick
43rd Battalion (The Hindmarsh Regiment) – Adelaide
48th Battalion (The Torrens Regiment) – Adelaide

13th Field Brigade
Headquarters – Adelaide
49th Field Battery – Adelaide
50th Field Battery – Prospect
113th (Heavy) Field Battery – Kilkenny
48th Field Battery (Attached) – Keswick

Other units
10th Heavy Battery, RAA (PF) – Fort Largs
110th Heavy Battery, RAA (M) – Fort Largs
Detachment, RAE (PF) – Keswick
20th Heavy Battery, RAA (PF) – Fort Largs
120th Heavy Battery, RAA (M) – Fort Largs
3rd Troop, 2nd Field Squadron, RAE – Keswick
3rd Field Company, RAE – Keswick

Notes

References

 

History of South Australia
Military districts of Australia